Martin Hoberg Hedegaard, also known as Saveus (born 9 October 1992) is a Danish singer, songwriter and record producer. In 2016, he wrote and produced the EP Will Somebody Save Us and in 2018 he released his first full-length album, Neuro. The same year, he opened the Orange Stage at the Roskilde Festival.

Saveus has been praised by both Simon Cowell, Elton John and the legendary rockband, Queen, and has worked with artists and producers like Girls' Generation, Exo, and Andrew Dawson.

History

Childhood 
Martin was born in the small town of Ørum in central Jutland, Denmark and spent his entire life there with his mother Gitta, his father Peder, and his two older brothers Anders and Simon.

The X Factor 2008
Martin first rose to fame in 2008 as the winner of the first Danish series of The X Factor, the youngest winner worldwide at that time, taking the title at the age of 15. Throughout his participation in the first Danish series of The X Factor, Martin was highly praised by the three judges. During the auditions, one of the judges, his future mentor Remee, rose from his chair to shake his hand "before he became a superstar." Later, during the live shows, Martin's transformation into a national idol began after he powerfully performed songs such as "Kiss From a Rose" by Seal, "Rock With You" by Michael Jackson, and "Somebody to Love" by Queen. Internationally, he has been praised by X Factor creator Simon Cowell and Queen themselves. In the grand finale, Martin beat 23-year-old contestant Laura Arensbak Kjærgaard, with whom he had formed a strong friendship.

2009–2014: Songwriting 
After the release of his album Show The World, Martin focused on his career as a songwriter and producer. He went on to write numerous K-pop singles including "Black Suit" by Super Junior, "Galaxy Supernova" by Girls' Generation, "El Dorado" by Exo, and "뒷모습 (Steppin')" by TVXQ.

His first and only album as Martin "Show The World" sold 100.000 copies.

2015–present: Saveus 
During his time as a songwriter, Martin also worked on his own material. In 2015, he debuted at the Danish "P3 Guld" award-show with a live performance of his first single "Levitate Me". Not even the shows own production-team knew who Saveus was until it was revealed during his performance. "Levitate Me" charted at number 1 on iTunes and was picked as "Song of The Week" by P3. In November 2015, he supported the British pop band Years & Years on their European tour In 2016 he released the EP "Will Somebody Save Us" and went on his first tour around Denmark, selling out numerous shows in Copenhagen. During 2017 Saveus single "Watch The World" was picked up by Elton John on his radio show Rocket Hour.

In 2018, he released his debut album Neuro with the singles "Ready to Die" and "Time Can Heal a Man", with both singles gaining radio-airplay. The same year he opened the iconic Orange Stage at Roskilde Festival with an audience of more than 60,000 people, which was praised by critics.

Discography

Albums

References

External links

1992 births
The X Factor winners
Living people
21st-century Danish male singers